Mumuni is a Ghanaian name that may refer to
Given name
Mumuni Abudu Seidu, Ghanaian politician
Mumuni Bawumia, Ghanaian politician and writer
Mumuni Koray (died 1953), Ghananian royalty 

Surname
Abdul Mumuni (born 1973), Ghanaian football forward
Abdul Salam Mumuni, Ghanaian filmmaker
Bawa Mumuni (born 1986), Ghanaian football player
Muhammad Mumuni (born 1949), Ghanaian lawyer and politician